The Baroness Fiddlesticks is a two-act 1904 Broadway musical with a book by George de Long. It was directed by Al M. Holbrook. The show's music was composed by Emil Bruguiere, with lyrics by de Long. The show opened on November 21, 1904, and ran for 25 performances at the Casino Theatre before closing on December 10, 1904.

The show took place in contemporary England and was billed as "a musical satire on society".

Production 
The show was mired in controversy, mostly surrounding eighteen-year-old Anna Fitzhugh being cast in the show's titular role. One financial backer objected to her casting, and she was removed from the show by the end of its first week on Broadway. However, the other cast members supported Fitzhugh, saying she had been "very badly used". Many of the cast members put in their two-week notice by November 25. At the same time, conductor Arthur Weld had resigned.

Synopsis 
London musical hall entertainer Patrina is invited to a house party at Mashaway's country estate. However, she decides to attend the event as the Baroness Fiddlesticks. Mashaway, who wants to make his name as a member of the stock exchange, comes at odds with Patrina's masquerade.

Cast

Songs 
The order of songs is unknown, and they are thus presented alphabetically.

 At a Fancy Costume Ball (Isabelle)
 Could You But Know
 Daphne Sue
 Heigh Ho
 I'm Just about as I Ought to Be (Mashaway)
 Imogen
 Listen to the Night a-Singing (Geraldine)
 Mr. Bugaboo (Isabelle)
 Rachel O'Toole
 Seeing New York (Mashaway)
 Something or Other Sue
 Spring (Geraldine)
 To Arms! Hear the Cry! (Archer)
 Tra-la-la-la 
 What's the Use of Kisses 
 When I Drop 'Round  (Patrina)
 When You Don't Know 
 When You Love a Little Girl

Reception 
The New York Evening World praised Bruguiere's score as "worthwhile" saying that he "would undoubtedly have been able to get [the show] produced even if he had been broke". Brooklyn Life, the Galveston Daily News, and the Louisville Courier-Journal also praised the show's music. Both the Daily Times and Evening World papers were critical of the show's book.

The New York Times called the show "a decided hit" and praised its costuming.

Fitzhugh and the rest of the cast generally seemed to garner positive reviews.

References 

1904 musicals
Broadway musicals
Plays set in the 20th century
Plays set in England